Homalocantha is a genus of sea snails, marine gastropod mollusks in the family Muricidae, the murex snails or rock snails.

The placement of this genus in the subfamily Muricopsinae is doubtful, but the radula characters make it belong definitely in the family Muricidae.

Species
Species within the genus Homalocantha include:
 Homalocantha anatomica (Perry, 1811)
 Homalocantha anomaliae Kosuge, 1979
 Homalocantha digitata (Sowerby II, 1841)
 Homalocantha dondani D'Attilio & Kosuge, 1989
 Homalocantha dovpeledi Houart, 1982
 Homalocantha elatensis Heiman & Mienis, 2009
 Homalocantha granpoderi Merle & Garrigues, 2011
 Homalocantha lamberti (Poirier, 1883)
 Homalocantha melanamathos (Gmelin, 1791)
 Homalocantha ninae Merle & Garrigues, 2011
 Homalocantha nivea Granpoder & Garrigues, 2014
 Homalocantha oxyacantha (Broderip, 1833)
 Homalocantha pele (Pilsbry, 1918)
 Homalocantha pisori D'Attilio & Kosuge, 1989
 Homalocantha scorpio (Linnaeus, 1758)
 Homalocantha secunda (Lamarck, 1822)
 Homalocantha tortua (Broderip in Sowerby, 1834)
 Homalocantha vicdani D'Attilio & Kosuge, 1989
 Homalocantha zamboi (Burch & Burch, 1960)
Species brought into synonymy
 Homalocantha echiniformis Shikama, 1978: synonym of Favartia balteata (G. B. Sowerby II, 1841) (synonym)
 Homalocantha fauroti Jousseaume, 1888: synonym of Homalocantha anatomica (Perry, 1811) 
 Homalocantha rota (Mawe, 1823): synonym of Homalocantha anatomica (Perry, 1811)

References

 Merle D. & Garrigues B. (2011) Description of four new species of Muricidae (Mollusca, Gastropoda) from the Philippines and the Caribbean area. Zoosystema 33(4): 557-575

External links
 Mörch, O. A. L. (1852-1853). Catalogus conchyliorum quae reliquit D. Alphonso d'Aguirra & Gadea Comes de Yoldi, Regis Daniae Cubiculariorum Princeps, Ordinis Dannebrogici in Prima Classe & Ordinis Caroli Tertii Eques. Fasc. 1, Cephalophora, 170 pp. [1852]; Fasc. 2, Acephala, Annulata, Cirripedia, Echinodermata, 74 [+2] pp. [1853]. Hafniae [Copenhagen]: L. Klein. 76: p

 
Muricopsinae